Willis is an album by the ska/soul band the Pietasters, released in 1997. It was released during the mid- to late-1990s ska explosion, and reached No. 44 on the Heatseekers chart.

The album's first single was "Out All Night". The band supported the album by touring with the Cherry Poppin' Daddies.

Production
The album was produced and engineered by Brett Gurewitz. It contains covers of the Outsiders' "Time Won't Let Me" and Martha and the Vandellas' "Quicksand".

Critical reception
The Washington Post wrote that "the Pietasters mix soul and garage-rock just like any frat-party band of the last four decades ... It's a venerable party-rock formula, but rendered fresh by not only the ska-derived musical accents but also the band's solid songwriting and sheer verve." The Hartford Courant thought that "the playing throughout is gloriously sloppy; the tone, pointedly ironic ... This is ska without regrets."

AllMusic wrote that the band returns "to their roots of '60s pop, soul, and Motown R&B, all fueled by a syncopated beat."

Track listing
 "Crazy Monkey Woman" (Eckhardt/Goodin/Jackson) – 2:38
 "Out All Night" (Eckhardt/Gurewitz/Linares) – 3:16
 "Ocean" (Eckhardt/Goodin/Jackson) – 3:38
 "Fat Sack" (Eckhardt/Goodin/Jackson) – 2:40
 "Stone Feeling" (Eckhardt/Linares) – 4:06
 "Higher" (Eckhardt/Goodin/Jackson) – 4:45
 "Time Won't Let Me" (Tom King/Chet Kelly) – 3:06
 "Without You" (The Pietasters) – 3:23
 "Crime" (Eckhardt) – 5:02
 "Quicksand" (H. Lewis/K. Lewis) – 2:46
 "Bitter" (Eckhardt/Goodin/Jackson) – 3:53
 "New Breed" (Jimmy Easter) – 2:59
 "Moment" (Eckhardt/Goodin/Jackson) – 3:45

Personnel
 Stephen Jackson - vocals
 Tom Goodin - guitar
 Todd Eckhardt - bass guitar
 Rob Steward - drums
 Alan Makranczy - saxophone, backing vocals
 Jeremy Roberts - trombone, backing vocals
 Toby Hansen - trumpet
 DJ Selah - additional vocals on track 4
 Caroline Boutwell - farfisa
 Dave Pinkert - Hammond, B-3, Wurlitzer electric piano
 Andy Kaulkin - piano
 Carlos Linares - additional trumpet on track 7, creative consultant
 Brett Gurewitz - producer, engineer
 Don Cameron - assistant producer
 Paul Dugre - assistant producer
 Joe Breuer - assistant producer
 Paul Naguua - assistant producer
 Maurice Iragorri - assistant producer
 Milton Chan - assistant producer

References

1997 albums
The Pietasters albums
Epitaph Records albums